Grötzingen Jewish Cemetery ( or ) is the smallest Jewish burial place in the city of Karlsruhe, Baden-Württemberg, Germany. It is listed as a national heritage site.

History
Until 1900, the dead of the Jewish community of Grötzingen were buried at Obergrombach Jewish Cemetery northeast of Karlsruhe. The Jewish cemetery of Grötzingen was built in 1905–6 on Junghälden field on Werrabronner Straße. It is now surrounded by modern buildings.

The cemetery stretches on a 0.18 acres area and has 13 graves, the oldest datable one being from 1905.

The ground of the cemetery is fully covered with screed.

References

Bibliography
 
  :  (Gedenkbuch der Synagogen in Deutschland, vol. 4), .

External links
 

Jewish cemeteries in Baden-Württemberg
Buildings and structures in Karlsruhe
1905 establishments in Germany
Heritage sites in Baden-Württemberg